Pennsylvania Route 163 (PA 163) is a state highway in the U.S. state of Pennsylvania. The state highway, which is a two-lane undivided road its entire length, runs  from the Maryland state line, where the highway continues south as Maryland Route 63 (MD 63), east to U.S. Route 11 (US 11) in Antrim Township in southern Franklin County. The route begins at the Maryland border by following Williamsport Pike north before it quickly turns east onto Mason Dixon Road, with State Route 3001 (SR 3001) continuing north on Williamsport Pike. PA 163 runs immediately to the north of the state line along Mason Dixon Road, coming to an interchange at Interstate 81 (I-81) before ending at US 11. The Williamsport Pike section of the route was originally a 19th-century turnpike connecting Williamsport, Maryland, with Greencastle, Pennsylvania. Williamsport Pike was paved by 1930 while Mason Dixon Road was paved in the 1930s. PA 163 was designated to its present alignment in the 1960s.

Route description

PA 163 begins at the Maryland state line in Antrim Township. The roadway continues south as MD 63 (Greencastle Pike) toward Cearfoss and the town of Williamsport. PA 163 begins heading north from the state line on two-lane undivided Williamsport Pike, then immediately turns east onto Mason Dixon Road. Williamsport Pike continues north as SR 3001, an unsigned quadrant route, toward the borough of Greencastle. The distance reduces to less than  after the state highway crosses Norfolk Southern Railway's Lurgan Branch at-grade. PA 163 continues east through farmland, intersecting Maugansville Road on the Maryland side before reaching its interchange with I-81 (American Legion Memorial Highway). The ramps to and from southbound I-81 are on the Maryland side of the highway, while the ramps to and from northbound I-81 are in Pennsylvania. PA 163 continues east into the unincorporated village of State Line where the highway reaches its eastern terminus at US 11 (Molly Pitcher Highway) just north of where US 11 enters Maryland.

History
The small north-south section of present-day PA 163 between the Maryland border and Mason Dixon Road was part of a 19th-century turnpike known as the Williamsport and Greencastle Turnpike, which connected Williamsport, Maryland with Greencastle, Pennsylvania. When Pennsylvania legislated routes in 1911, what is now PA 163 was not given a number. By 1930, Williamsport Pike was an unnumbered paved road. Mason Dixon Road was paved in the 1930s. PA 163 was designated in the 1960s to run along its current alignment between MD 63 at the Maryland border and US 11 in State Line, with an interchange at I-81.

Major intersections

See also

References

External links

Pennsylvania Highways: PA 163 

163
Pennsylvania Route 163